LMO is the debut album by Lingua Mortis Orchestra in collaboration with heavy metal band Rage, released on 2 August 2013 through Nuclear Blast Records. The production was helmed by Charlie Bauerfeind.

Album information
The album was composed by Victor Smolski and Peter "Peavy" Wagner, who cooperated with two orchestras from Spain and Belarus, enlarging the number of this project's participants to more than 100. Together with longtime co-producer Charlie Bauerfeind, was produced and mixed the record in Twilight Hall Studio in Krefeld, Germany. 
LMO follows the concept of the burning of witches in Gelnhausen in 1599 and was written by vocalist Peter Wagner based on a true story. 
The cover artwork was created by Felipe Machado Franco who had also been responsible for the latest Rage artwork, 21. The band photos were shot by Pia Kintrup.

Track listing

Bonus DVD track listing

Personnel

Band members
 Peter "Peavy" Wagner – vocals, bass 
 Victor Smolski – guitar 
 André Hilgers – drums
 Jeannette Marchewka – Additional vocals
 Dana Harnge – Additional vocals

Additional musicians
 Henning Basse – backing vocals; guest vocals on "Scapegoat" and "Witches' Judge"

Production
 Charlie Bauerfeind – producer, engineering, mixing, mastering 
 Victor Smolski – producer, mixing, mastering

2013 albums
Rage (German band) albums
Nuclear Blast albums
Albums produced by Charlie Bauerfeind